Marian Różański (2 July 1864 – 10 May 1927) was a lawyer and Polish independence activist operating in Upper Silesia. He lived in Rybnik.

History 
Marian Różański was born on 2 July 1864 in Padniewo, Kingdom of Prussia, German Confederation. In 1908 he moved to Rybnik.

He was co-organizer of the First Silesian Uprising in 1919. After the fail of the uprising, he got beaten and arrested by Germany, being imprisoned in Nysa, Free State of Prussia. In 1919, he had established the office of the Polish Red Cross. He was a manager of the Polish Plebiscite Committee, which in 1921 had handled the Upper Silesia plebiscite. After the plebiscite, when Rybnik was transferred to Poland, Różański had become a member of the Citizen Council, the provisional government of Rybnik.

He was awarded the Knight's (1923) and Commander's Cross of the Order of Polonia Restituta, Cross on the Silesian Band of Bravery and Merit, Star of Upper Silesia and Silesian Uprising Cross.

He died on 10 May 1927 in Lubliniec, Poland, and was buried in Rybnik.

Orders 
 Knight's Cross of Order of Polonia Restituta (1923)
 Commander's Cross of Order of Polonia Restituta
 Cross on the Silesian Band of Bravery and Merit
 Star of Upper Silesia
 Silesian Uprising Cross

References 

1864 births
1927 deaths
People from Rybnik
19th-century Polish lawyers
Polish independence activists
Knights of the Order of Polonia Restituta
Commanders of the Order of Polonia Restituta
20th-century Polish lawyers